Vicki Goldberg is an American photography critic, author, and photo historian based in New Hampshire, United States. She has written books and articles on photography and its social history.

Biography
Born in St. Louis, Missouri, Goldberg earned a master's degree in art history from New York University Institute of Fine Arts.

Goldberg's books include The Power of Photography: How Photographs Changed Our Lives; Light Matters (a selection of her essays); and The White House: The President's Home in Photographs and History; as well as editing the anthology Photography in Print: Writings from 1816 to the Present. Her first biography, Margaret Bourke-White, took an in-depth look at the life and techniques of Margaret Bourke-White, a photographer active in the early to mid-20th Century.

Goldberg co-wrote A Nation of Strangers: Essays with Arthur Ollman, and American Photography: A Century of Images with art historian Robert Silberman. She has also written introductions to a number of photographic monographs.

Margaret Bourke-White and The Power of Photography were included in the American Library Association's lists of best books of their respective years. In 2006, Photography in Print was named by The Wall Street Journal  one of the year's five best books on photography.

Goldberg has written for The New York Times and Vanity Fair. She has lectured in Belgium, England, France, China, Korea, Norway and Portugal as well as America. She currently works as a freelance writer and lecturer.

In 1997, she received the International Center of Photography's Infinity Award. In 1999, she received the Royal Photographic Society's J Dudley Johnston Award.

References

Sources
 Vicki Goldberg Biography at the Biography Resource Center

External links

Articles about Goldberg at the New York Times

Living people
Year of birth missing (living people)
Writers from St. Louis
Writers from New York City
New York University Institute of Fine Arts alumni
American art historians
American women historians
Historians of photography
Women art historians
Historians from New York (state)
21st-century American women